Radisav "Čile" Pavićević (12 October 1951 – 19 February 2019) was a Serbian handball player who competed for Yugoslavia in the 1976 Summer Olympics.

Club career
Pavićević started out at Crvenka and served the club for over a decade, before moving abroad to Germany. He would go on to play for SG Dietzenbach (1980–1982) and TuRU Düsseldorf in the Handball-Bundesliga.

International career
At international level, Pavićević represented Yugoslavia in two World Championships, winning the bronze medal in 1974. He also competed at the 1976 Summer Olympics.

References

External links
 

1951 births
2019 deaths
Serbian male handball players
Yugoslav male handball players
Olympic handball players of Yugoslavia
Handball players at the 1976 Summer Olympics
Competitors at the 1975 Mediterranean Games
Competitors at the 1979 Mediterranean Games
Mediterranean Games gold medalists for Yugoslavia
Mediterranean Games medalists in handball
RK Crvenka players
Handball-Bundesliga players
Expatriate handball players
Yugoslav expatriate sportspeople in Germany